Corypha utan, the cabbage palm, buri palm or gebang palm, is a species of palm native to Asia and Oceania.

Description 
Like other palms of genus Corypha, this species flowers at the end of its lifetime (monocarpy), producing a massive inflorescence up to 5 m tall containing up to one million flowers.

Distribution and habitat 
It is distributed from the Assam region of India through Indochina, Malaysia, and Indonesia to the Philippines and New Guinea, and south to Australia's Cape York Peninsula. Growing along watercourses, floodplains and grasslands, the Palm and Cycad Societies of Australia write about the Corypha utan palms occurring in Cape York:

Corypha utan .. is undoubtedly one of the most imposing species in the Australian palm flora (with its massive pachycaul trunks and hapaxanthic flowering and fruiting extravaganza.

Uses
The starch contained inside the trunk is edible raw or cooked, as is the tip-top. The flowering stalks can be beaten to produce liquid. The nut kernels are also edible.

Locally known as buri or buli in the Philippines, the leaves of Corypha utan are widely used in weaving fans, baskets, and mats. Additionally, in Isla Verde, Batangas where this palm tree grows abundantly, Corypha utan sap is extracted, cooked and made into the sweet delicacy called "Pakaskas".

References

utan
Flora of tropical Asia
Trees of Australia
Flora of Queensland
Flora of the Northern Territory
Taxa named by Jean-Baptiste Lamarck
Plants described in 1786